Catinella is a genus of small air-breathing land snails, terrestrial pulmonate gastropod mollusks in the family Succineidae, the amber snails.

Species
Species within this genus include:
 Catinella arenaria (Bouchard-Chantereaux, 1837) - synonym: Quickella arenaria
 Catinella aprica
 Catinella baldwini
 Catinella exile (Leonard, 1972) 
 Catinella explanata 
 Catinella gelida
 Catinella kuhnsi 
 Catinella montana 
 Catinella paropsis 
 Catinella protracta
 Catinella rehderi (Pilsbry, 1948)
 Catinella rotundata 
 Catinella rubida 
 Catinella stretchiana (Pilsbry, 1948) - Sierra ambersnail
 Catinella thaanumi 
 Catinella tuberculata

References

Succineidae
Taxa named by William Harper Pease